is a Japanese footballer currently playing as a forward for FC Machida Zelvia.

Career statistics

Club
.

Notes

References

External links

1997 births
Living people
People from Katsushika
Association football people from Tokyo
Ryutsu Keizai University alumni
Japanese footballers
Association football forwards
Japan Football League players
J1 League players
J2 League players
J3 League players
Thespakusatsu Gunma players
Oita Trinita players
Albirex Niigata players
Giravanz Kitakyushu players
FC Machida Zelvia players